Andrey Alyaksandrovich Syarohin (Andrei Aleksandrovich Seryogin; born 15 August 1976) is a former Belarusian football player.

Honours
Shakhtyor Soligorsk
Belarusian Cup winner: 2003–04

References

1976 births
People from Yevpatoria
Living people
Belarusian footballers
FC Starye Dorogi players
FC Neman Grodno players
FC Tyumen players
Belarusian expatriate footballers
Expatriate footballers in Russia
Russian Premier League players
FC Dynamo Brest players
FC Chornomorets Odesa players
Expatriate footballers in Ukraine
Ukrainian Premier League players
FC Saturn Ramenskoye players
FC Dinamo Minsk players
FC Shakhtyor Soligorsk players
FC Oryol players
FC Vostok players
Expatriate footballers in Kazakhstan
FC Zhetysu players
FC SKA-Khabarovsk players
FC Kristall Smolensk players
Belarusian Premier League players
Kazakhstan Premier League players
Association football forwards